Short But Funky is the first promotional single released by Too Short for his album Short Dog's in the House, released in 1990. The song samples "High" by Skyy. It is considered one of Too Short's more notable songs, and was re-released in 2006 on Mack of the Century... Too Short's Greatest Hits. Unlike many of Too Short's songs, Short But Funky is devoid of profanity or violent content, and is much more light-hearted, and friendly for radio play.

The song was not written by Shaw, but rather instead was written by Dame "Dangerous" Edwards and Keenan Foster. The original intent was to allow Too Short to adapt a much more different flow and rap to different subject matter. The song also contains a subliminal MC Hammer diss, who was another Oakland emcee that was high-charting, with his more pop-oriented content.

Track listing
 US 12" vinyl
 "Short But Funky" (Radio Version) (4:13)
 "Short But Funky" (Hula & K Fingers Remix) (3:41)
 "Short But Funky" (Extended Remix) (5:30)
 "Life Is... Too Short" (Live in Oakland 1990) (3:48)
 "Short But Funky" (Instrumental) (4:39)

Chart Positions

References 

1990 songs
1990 singles
Too Short songs
Jive Records singles